CFIG Arena is a football stadium in Pardubice, Czech Republic. It is the home stadium of FK Pardubice. It has a capacity of 4,600 seats.

History
The stadium was built in 1930–1931. In May 1931 stadium was opened by the first Czechoslovak president Tomáš Garrigue Masaryk. Formerly known as Letní stadion, it was a multi-purpose stadium until 1968, then it served only for football and American football. Stadium capacity from the original 15,000 spectators dropped to just 1,000 spectators.

Present
In 2021–2023, the stadium was completely reconstructed to meet the criteria for the Czech First League. The stadium was formally renamed to CFIG Arena for sponsopship reasons, but unofficially it is called Arnošt Košťál Stadium.

The first match to take place at the stadium was the Czech First League match on 4 January 2023, with Pardubice hosting Slavia Prague. The hosts won 2–0.

References

External links
CFIG Arena – FK Pardubice

Football venues in the Czech Republic
Sports venues completed in 1931
Sport in Pardubice
Buildings and structures in Pardubice
FK Pardubice
1931 establishments in Czechoslovakia
Czech First League venues
20th-century architecture in the Czech Republic